Alfred Altenberg  (born in 1878 in Warsaw, died May 8, 1924 in Lviv) was a Polish bookseller and publisher.

He worked in Lviv. In 1897 he took over the family business, Wydawnictwo Altenberga, from his father Herman (1848–1885), and ran the Herman Alternberg Book Store. He published numerous illustrated classics of Polish literature, reproductions of works of Artur Grottger, Szymon Askenazy, books about art and drama and a series of popular science knowledge and life books, amongst others.

References

1878 births
1924 deaths
Businesspeople from Lviv
People from Warsaw Governorate
Polish printers
Polish booksellers